Two ships of the United States Navy have borne the name USS Verdin:

  was a  that was launched in 1944 and served as YMS-471 until renamed Verdin in 1947.
  was a projected Chanticleer-class submarine rescue ship, cancelled after the surrender of Japan in 1945.

United States Navy ship names